Legalize It is the fifth EP released by the hip hop band Kottonmouth Kings. The EP was scheduled for a digital release on April 20, 2011 (4-20), but it was released a day early on April 19.

Track listing

References 

Kottonmouth Kings albums
2011 EPs
Suburban Noize Records EPs